Mariya Markovna Shkolnik (previously transliterated as Marie Sukloff, Russian: Мария Марковна Школьник) (6 March 1882 - 9 April 1955) was a member of the Russian revolutionary movement that attempted to assassinate Alexei Khvostov and escaped exile in Siberia twice. Mariya was a member of the Socialist Revolutionary Party and assisted in the propaganda efforts of the party among peasant populations.

Life 
Mariya Shkolnik was born to a poor, Jewish, peasant family in Borovoi-Mlin, a village in Vilna in modern-day Belarus, not far from the town of Smarhon'. Mariya started working at a young age and was not sent to school. She did however learn to read from the daughter of a rabbi named Hannah who would often meet with peasant girls in Vilna to teach them progressive politics and economics.

As a teenager Mariya worked with Hannah to organize tailors and seamstresses in Vilna towards striking. After organizing in Ashmyany, Mariya felt that her future would be better in a city. Eventually, she convinced her father to send her to her uncle's apartment in Odessa. In Odessa she worked in a candy factory and lived with many other people sharing her political ideology.

References

1882 births
1955 deaths
Russian revolutionaries
Russian socialists
Internal exiles from the Russian Empire